is a Japanese manga artist, musician and actor. He is among the most famous authors of horror manga and has been vital for its development since the 1960s.

Life 
Umezz was born in Kōya, Wakayama Prefecture, but raised in the mountainous Gojō, Nara Prefecture. His mother motivated him to draw when he was seven years old. His father would tell him local legends about ghost and snake women before going to bed. He was inspired to start drawing manga by reading Osamu Tezuka's Shin Takarajima in fifth grade. He was part of a drawing circle with others called "Kaiman Club".

In 1955, he published his first manga at the age of 18 with Mori no Kyōdai based on the fairytale Hansel and Gretel with the kashihon publisher Tomo Book. He would soon shift towards the gekiga movement and publish manga in the kashi-hon industry in Osaka of the time, which would allow him more freedom than serializing his manga in magazines. His specialty was to include paranormal elements in his stories. At the same time, he also started working on shōjo manga; he published in the magazine Shōjo Book and the kashi-hon anthology Niji. After moving to Tokyo in 1963 due to the decline of the kashihon industry, he developed his specific style, which blended the aesthetics of shōjo manga with grotesque horror visuals. Horror manga like Nekome no Shōjo and Reptilia became a hit in the magazine Shōjo Friend.

In the late 1960s, he also started publishing in shōnen manga magazines and he switched publishing houses, from Kodansha to Shogakukan, when a new editor asked him to draw something other than horror manga. He became a well established author and was at times working at up to five serials at the same time. In 1974 he won the 20th Shogakukan Manga Award for his series The Drifting Classroom about a school including its schoolchildren and teachers being teleported into an alternate post-apocalyptic universe.

In 1975, Umezu started becoming a public figure also apart from creating manga. He recorded songs based on his horror manga and released them as the solo album Yami no Album. 

His comedy manga Makoto-chan, which he published from 1976 to 1981 in Weekly Shōnen Sunday, became a hit. The hand gesture "Gwash" from the manga became Umezu's own trademark hand gesture as well in public. In the 1980s and 1990s, he focused on science fiction manga depicting a near future like Watashi wa Shingo and Fourteen.

In 1995, he had to retire from regular publishing due to tendinitis after finishing Fourteen. He then became even more of a public figure, appearing regularly on TV in a red and white striped shirt. He was also famous for the architecture of his candy-striped home in Kichijōji, inspired by his Makoto-chan series. In 2011, he released a second music album with his songs.

In 2018 he was awarded the Prize for Inheritance at the Angoulême International Comics Festival for the French translation of Watashi wa Shingo. This was the second prize awarded him throughout his career and Umezu had previously been unhappy about the amount of recognition he had gotten for his work. The award motivated him to start working again and he produced a series of 101 paintings based on Watashi wa Shingo, which were exhibited for the first time in 2022 and were his first new work in 27 years.

Themes 
Many of his manga feature intergenerational conflict between children and adults. The children of the deserted school in The Drifting Classroom are immediately betrayed by their teachers and need to fight for their own survival. In Watashi wa Shingo, children are the only ones able to communicate and have an emotional connection with an AI computer. Umezu explained that he himself finds the world of children more relatable, as children are much more open to illogical and adaptable in their thinking: "I’m writing about myself in a way. I don’t want to become an adult and 'grow up.'"

Reception and legacy 
His works inspired a new generation of horror manga artists. Junji Ito and Toru Yamazaki cite him as one of their biggest influences and Kanako Inuki got her career start in a magazine compiled by him. Rumiko Takahashi brief worked as an assistant for him, while he was working on Makoto-chan. His reputation gave him the nickname "god of horror manga" (ホラーまんがの神様) in Japanese media.

Umezu regularly received complaint letters from parents in the beginning of his career due to his horror visuals and also editors of magazines would ask him to scale down the violence in his imagery. He remarks in an interview: "I was protested but never boycotted. I considered such criticism to be a form of praise." He was critical of watering down horror elements: "Old Japanese folk stories and fairy tales could be unflinchingly brutal. They come from a time when tragedy and carnage was an everyday part of life. Now we have people calling to water them down, which essentially whitewashes history. It’s insulting to the memory of those who suffered to bring us these stories."

Academic Tomoko Yamada counts Umezu as one of the shōjo manga artists in the 1950s who contributed to the development of ballet manga with his series Haha Yobu Koe (1958) and Maboroshi Shōjo (1959).

Works

Manga

Paintings 
 Zoku-Shingo Chiisa na Robotto Shingo Bijutsukan (ZOKU-SHINGO 小さなロボット シンゴ美術館; 2022)

Films 
Nekome Kozo (anime television series)
Drifting Classroom (movie)
Blood Baptism (movie)
Drifting School (movie)
Long Love Letter: Drifting Classroom (TV drama)
Kazuo Umezu's Horror Theater (6-part TV anthology)
The Snake Girl and the Silver-Haired Witch ("Hebimusume to hakuhatsuma") (1968) (Daiei/Kadokawa Pictures)
Tamami: The Baby's Curse (film)
Mother (film) (director)

Albums 

 Yami no Album (闇のアルバム; 1975)
 Yami no Album 2 (闇のアルバム・2; 2011)

Musicals 
In 2016, his manga My Name is Shingo was adapted into a musical. It stars Mitsuki Takahata and Mugi Kadowaki as the lead characters and is directed and choreographed by Philippe Decouflé.

Assistants
 Noboru Takahashi
 Robin Nishi
 Rumiko Takahashi

References

External links

  (Japanese/English/German)
 
 Profile  at The Ultimate Manga Page
 Profile at The Lambiek Comiclopedia
 My Name is Shingo, the Musical

 
1936 births
Living people
Japanese horror writers
Manga artists from Nara Prefecture
People from Wakayama Prefecture